Hermann Kutschera (April 27, 1903 –  November 4, 1991) was an Austrian architect. He was born in Vienna. In 1936 he won a gold medal in the art competitions of the Olympic Games for his "Sprungschanze mit Stadion" ("Skiing Stadium").

References

External links
 Profile on ÖOC
 dataOlympics profile
 

1903 births
1991 deaths
Olympic gold medalists in art competitions
20th-century Austrian architects
Medalists at the 1936 Summer Olympics
Olympic competitors in art competitions
Architects from Vienna